Erin Rowell (née Normoyle) (born 19 January 1983) is an Australian Paralympic cyclist. She won a bronze medal at her first Para-cycling Track World Championships. Prior to transferring to cycling, she was an international motocross rider.

Personal
In 2010, she was involved in a serious head-on motor vehicle accident near Red Bud, Illinois. She suffered multiple fractures to her leg, as well as chest and rib injuries. Rowell with her husband Ryan operate in the TORQ F1T fitness centre in Torquay, Victoria.

Sport
In 2004, she moved to the United States to pursue a career in motocross riding and further
her modelling career.

In 2022, Rowell became first AusCycling’s Fast Track program to be selected to a national team after her earning selection for the 2022 UCI Para-cycling Track World Championships in  Saint-Quentin-en-Yvelines, France. She is classified as C5 rider.

At the 2022 UCI Para-cycling Track World Championships in  Saint-Quentin-en-Yvelines, France, she won the bronze medal in the Women's Time Trial C5 and finished 11th in the Women's Individual Pursuit C5.

References

Living people
1983 births
Australian female cyclists
Paralympic cyclists of Australia
Australian motocross riders